The 1968 Soviet football championship was the 36th seasons of competitive football in the Soviet Union and the 30th among teams of sports societies and factories. Dinamo Kiev won the championship becoming the Soviet domestic champions for the fourth time and the third in a row becoming the second team to accomplish it.

Honours

Notes = Number in parentheses is the times that club has won that honour. * indicates new record for competition

Soviet Union football championship

Class A First Group

Class A Second Group finals

For places 1-4
 [Nov 17–24, Sochi]

Relegation Tournament for Ukraine
 [Nov 12-20]

Class B

Russian Federation finals

Final group
 [Nov 4–17, Pyatigorsk]

Ukraine finals

 [Oct 25 – Nov 7, Ternopol, Chernovtsy]

Match for 1st place 
 Avangard Ternopol  2-0  Bukovina Chernovtsy

Kazakhstan

Match for 1st place 
 Yenbek Jezkazgan  2-0  ADK Alma-Ata

Central Asia

Top goalscorers

Class A First Group
Berador Abduraimov (Pakhtakor Tashkent), Gocha Gavasheli (Dinamo Tbilisi) – 22 goals

References

External links
 1968 Soviet football championship. RSSSF